ANU Solar Racing  (formally known at MTAA Super Solar Racing or Sol Invictus) is the Australian National University's student-led solar car racing team. The team is built to innovate, bringing together a highly range of backgrounds ranging from engineering and science through to commerce and law. The team consists of all undergraduate students, and is split into an Executive Team, Technical Team, and Business Team. The team competes in the biennial World Solar Challenge from Darwin to Adelaide, covering 3,022 km of road. The next event for ANU Solar Racing event was originally for the 2021 Bridgestone World Solar Car Competition, but due to the impacts of COVID, this event has been cancelled.

Mission 

The ANU Solar Racing team is focused on development and construction of a solar electric vehicle that can compete in the Bridgestone World Solar Challenge held in Australia between Darwin and Adelaide every two years.

According to the ANU Solar Racing team, the student-led organisation mission is to enrich education, drive renewable energy innovation, uniting students to push the limits in automotive racing. The team also wants to construct a sustainable and rewarding student led program at the ANU which allows students to develop professional and practical skills that they are not able to develop in the classroom. The team's long term goal is to win the Bridgestone World Solar Challenge by 2025.

MTAA Super Charge 2.0 
The MTAA SuperCharge 2 is the second solar car from the ANU. Designed for the 2019 Bridgestone World Solar Challenge (BWSC). Building on the experiences and lessons from 2017, the team undertook a complete redesign and built a new car from the ground up. The team featured some familiar solar car faces as well as a host of new members to lean and bring their skillsets to the project. Over the last 2 years, behind the scenes; these students have worked tirelessly to produce this car and have also used the platform to promote renewable energies and STEM. The team proved the reliability of MTAA SuperCharge 2 throughout the 2019 BWSC with only minor issues during hundreds of kilometres of testing and the race; managing to drive 1500 km off the sun.

MTAA Super Charge 1.0 
The ANU Solar Racing debut occurred at the 30th Anniversary of the Bridgestone World Solar Challenge in 2017. After qualifying to race in the Adventure Class, the MTAA Super Charge finished within the top 20 in a very competitive field; this first attempt offering both growth and experience for future races.

References

External links
 ANU Solar Racing Website
ANU Solar Racing Facebook

Solar car racing
World Solar Challenge
Australian National University